The Barcelona Open was a professional golf tournament that was held in Barcelona, Catalonia, Spain. Founded as the Sanyo Open in 1981, it was an event on the European Tour from 1982 until 1988, after which it was replaced on the tour schedule by the Catalan Open. For the first two editions it was played at Club de Golf Sant Cugat, and thereafter at Real Club de Golf El Prat.

After sponsors Sanyo withdrew following the 1986 tournament, promoters IMG supported the event in 1987. However persistent bad weather rendered the El Prat course unplayable and the tournament was ultimately postponed until 1988.

The two most notable winners were Spanish major champions Seve Ballesteros in 1985 and José María Olazábal in 1986. The final tournament in 1988 was won by England's David Whelan, who defeated Nick Faldo, Barry Lane  and Mark Mouland in a four-way playoff. Whelan, who had borrowed money from his parents in order to make the trip to Spain to compete in the tournament, triumphed at the 4th extra hole after the four players had tied at 276 (12 under par) after 72 holes.

Winners

References

External links
Coverage on the European Tour's official site (1982–1986)
Coverage on the European Tour's official site (1988)

Former European Tour events
Golf tournaments in Catalonia
Sports competitions in Barcelona
Recurring sporting events established in 1982
Recurring events disestablished in 1986
1982 establishments in Spain
1988 disestablishments in Spain
Defunct sports competitions in Spain